Near the Rainbow's End is a 1930 American Western film directed by J. P. McGowan for Tiffany Productions. The film stars Bob Steele in his talking picture debut as a singing cowboy, Lafe McKee and Al Ferguson and was commercially released in the United States on June 10, 1930.

Plot
Rancher Tug Wilson (Alfred Hewston) discovers his mate's diabolical scheme, only to be killed instantly. The criminal rancher, Buck Rankin (Al Ferguson), is guilty of killing the Bledsoes' cattle. Buck blames Tug's death on Jim (Bob Steele), the son of Tom Bledsoe (Lafe McKee). Seeking revenge, Tug's daughter Ruth (Louise Lorraine) joins a movement led by Buck to kill Jim. Jim narrowly escapes his first capture attempt but knows he will not make it far. Luckily for him, a sheep herder has witnessed Buck killing Tug and the cattle. With the truth out, Sheriff Hank Bosley (Hank Bell), who was initially on Buck's side, promptly arrests the guilty rancher.

Cast
 Bob Steele as Jim Bledsoe
 Lafe McKee as Tom Bledsoe
 Al Ferguson as Buck Rankin
 Alfred Hewston as Tug Wilson
 Louise Lorraine as Ruth Wilson
 Hank Bell as Sheriff Hank Bosley

See also
 Bob Steele filmography

References

Bibliography
 Fagen, Herb (2003). The Encyclopedia of Westerns. New York: Facts On File. .

External links
 

1930 films
1930 Western (genre) films
1930s English-language films
American black-and-white films
American Western (genre) films
Tiffany Pictures films
Films directed by J. P. McGowan
1930s American films